Jean-Jacques Ferrara (born 16 June 1967) is a French politician representing the Republicans. He was elected to the French National Assembly on 18 June 2017, representing the department of Corse-du-Sud.

See also
 2017 French legislative election

References

1967 births
Living people
Deputies of the 15th National Assembly of the French Fifth Republic
The Republicans (France) politicians
Politicians from Marseille
French people of Corsican descent